The Zürcher Oberland ("Zurich highlands") in Switzerland, is the hilly south-eastern part of the canton of Zurich, bordering on the Toggenburg, including the districts of Uster, Hinwil, Pfäffikon as well as the Töss Valley as far as the district of Winterthur. The territory gradually fell under the control of the city of Zurich from 1408 to 1452. In the 18th century, the jurisdiction lay with the reeve of Grüningen for the southern part, and with the reeve of Kyburg for the northern part together with most of the Zürcher Unterland.

Municipalities: Bäretswil - Bauma - Bubikon - Dürnten-Tann - Fällanden -Fehraltorf - Fischenthal - Gossau - Greifensee - Grüningen - Hinwil - Hittnau - Kyburg - Maur - Mönchaltorf - Pfäffikon - Russikon - Rüti - Schlatt - Seegräben - Sternenberg - Turbenthal - Uster - Volketswil - Wald - Weisslingen - Wetzikon - Wila - Wildberg - Zell.

Notable tourist destinations are primarily hiking and cycling, among many others the Pfäffikersee and Greifensee lakes, Bachtel mountain and Tösstal valley as well as the Pfannenstiel region, Jucker Farm, Aathal Dinosaur Museum, some notable medieval castles (Bubikon, Kyburg, Greifensee, Uster, Rapperswil), economic history museums and other monuments as well as the nearby Zürichsee region around Rapperswil.

External links

(ZVV) destinations, S-Bahn Zürich  
Zürich Oberland Tourismus

References

Geography of the canton of Zürich
Regions of Switzerland
Highlands